This is a list of casinos in Washington.

List of casinos

Gallery

See also

List of casinos in the United States 
List of casino hotels

References

External links

 

Washington State
Casinos